Luis Miguel Garcés (born August 12, 1982) is an Ecuadorian footballer.

External links
Player's FEF Card

1982 births
Living people
People from Machala
Association football forwards
Ecuadorian footballers
Ecuadorian Serie A players
C.S.D. Macará footballers
L.D.U. Quito footballers
Barcelona S.C. footballers
Fuerza Amarilla S.C. footballers
Mushuc Runa S.C. footballers
C.D. ESPOLI footballers
Fuerza Amarilla S.C. managers